The inaugural squash competition at the 1998 Commonwealth Games took place in Kuala Lumpur, Malaysia from 11 September until 21 September 1998. There were no bronze medal play off matches because both losing semi-finalists were awarded a bronze medal.

Medallists

Results

Men's singles (10-16 Sep)

Women's singles (10-16 Sep)

Men's doubles (17-20 Sep)

Women's doubles (17-20 Sep)

Mixed doubles (17-20 Sep)

References

1998 Commonwealth Games events